An urban planner (also known as town planner) is a professional who practices in the field of town planning, urban planning or city planning.

An urban planner may focus on a specific area of practice and have a title such as city planner, town planner, regional planner, long-range planner, transportation planner, infrastructure planner, environmental planner, parks planner, physical planner, health planner, planning analyst, urban designer, community development director, economic development specialist or other similar combinations. Royal Town Planning Institute is the oldest professional body of town and urban planners founded in 1914 and the University of Liverpool established the first dedicated planning school in the world in 1909.

Responsibilities 

The responsibilities of an urban planner vary between jurisdictions, and sometimes within jurisdictions. The following is therefore a general description of the responsibilities of an urban planner, of which an urban planner may well typically practise two or more of. An urban planner may also specialize in one responsibility only.

Land use planning

Urban planners specializing in land use planning are predominantly concerned with the regulation of land use, development and subdivision, with the intent of achieving the desired urban planning outcome.

Regulation of land use and development is achieved via the drafting and adoption of planning instruments designed to influence the land use and built form goals of the jurisdiction. The planning instruments take the form of legislation and policy, and have a wide variety of terms across jurisdictions including acts and regulations, rules, codes, schemes, plans, policies, and manuals; and often a combination of some of these. The planning instruments often spatially zone land or reserve the land for certain purposes, presented in the form of a zoning map or plan. The urban planner is tasked with preparing planning instruments and zoning plans. Further, given urban development is rarely static and the goals of urban planning change from time to time, the urban planner will be responsible for continuously maintaining planning instruments and zoning plans to ensure they are kept up-to-date.

Consultation with the community and other stakeholders is generally desired by urban planners in most jurisdictions when planning instruments are prepared and updated. The level of consultation will vary depending on the project.

The urban planner will also be responsible for implementing the planning instruments. This is achieved through a permit process, where the proponent of a proposed development, a change in land use, or the proposed subdivision of an allotment will be required to obtain a permit, approval, licence, or consent for the proposed development or change of use. An urban planner will be tasked with considering the proposal and determining whether it complies with the intent and the specific provisions of the applicable planning instruments and zoning plans. Depending on the jurisdiction, the urban planner may have authority to determine the proposal; otherwise the planner will present a recommendation to the decision-maker, often a panel of non-planners (for example, the elected council of a local government).

While concerned with future development, an urban planner will occasionally be responsible for investigating development or land use which had been undertaken without authorization. In many jurisdictions urban planners can require that unauthorized land use cease and unauthorized development is returned to its predevelopment condition; or alternatively retrospectively approve the unauthorized development or land use.

Strategic urban planning

In order to plan effectively for long-term development and growth, an urban planner will be responsible for the preparation of a strategic plan (also known in different jurisdictions by names such as development plan, core strategy, comprehensive plan, planning strategy, structure plan, etc.). Strategic urban planning sets the high-level goals and growth principles for a jurisdiction, which will in turn inform the preparation and amendment of the legal planning instruments within that jurisdiction.

Regional planning

Regional planning deals with the planning of land use, infrastructure and settlement growth over a geographical area which extends to a whole city or beyond. In this sense, the urban planner's role is to consider urban planning at a macro scale. Regional planning is not concerned with planning at the local (neighborhood) level.

Heritage and conservation

An urban planner may be responsible for identifying, protecting and conserving / restoring buildings and places which are identified by a community as having cultural heritage significance. This may include the task of compiling and maintaining a heritage register, finding and making available incentives for encouraging conservation works, and the consideration of proposals to redevelop or use a heritage-listed place.

Urban revitalization

As urban areas decline, an urban planner may be tasked with preparing a plan for the redevelopment of an urban area. Such plans are not limited to an individual development site but rather encompass a locality or district over which an urban redevelopment plan is prepared.

Urban revitalization often relies on obtaining funding from government sources to assist in the regeneration of an area; the funding may be used for a variety of purposes such as improvement of public roads, parks and other public spaces; development of infrastructure; and acquisition of land. The urban planner will be responsible for costing an urban revitalization plan and obtaining funding for infrastructure works necessary to implement the urban renewal plan.

The urban planner for an urban revitalization project needs to liaise closely with stakeholders during the preparation and implementation of the plan, including government agencies, landowners and community groups.

Master planning

A master plan will be prepared for many greenfield development projects. The purpose of a master plan is to plan for the ultimate spatial layout of the land uses for a future development area. A master plan will consider the required infrastructure to service the development and determine the need and location of urban amenities including commercial and industrial land, community facilities, schools, parks, public transport, major roads, and land uses, both within and outside the master plan area, and consider the staging of development of a master planned area.

The urban planner will be responsible for coordinating the various professional consultant inputs, and to lay out the master plan infrastructure and land uses. It will often be necessary for the urban planner to consult with landowners and government agencies affected by the master plan.

Transportation planning

An urban planner may be responsible for planning for transport facilities and infrastructure in urban and inter-regional areas.

Economic development

An urban planner's responsibility may extend to economic development. In this sense, an urban planner may be responsible for identifying opportunities for economic growth, and encourage investment in an area.

Environmental planning

An urban planner may be concerned with the impact of land use, development and subdivision on the natural environment including land, water, flora, and fauna, to achieve sustainable outcomes.

Urban design

An urban planner will develop the design of public spaces (streets, squares, parks, etc.) and the relationship between built form and public spaces. Depending on the country and planner's training they may work with other design professionals such as civil engineers, architects or landscape architects to complete and construct the design.

Infrastructure planning

An urban planner may be required to plan for the future provision of public works infrastructure such as water supply, sewerage, electricity, telecommunications, and transport infrastructure, and community infrastructure including schools, hospitals and parks.

Education and training

Urban Planning as a profession is a relatively young discipline. Urban Planning is an interdisciplinary field closely related to civil engineering. Few government agencies restrict or license the profession. As a result, a number of other related disciplines actively claim to have the training, expertise and professional scope to practise urban planning. While organizations such as the American Planning Association, the Canadian Institute of Planners and the Royal Town Planning Institute certify professional planners, others in related fields like Landscape Architecture also claim to have professional autonomy in urban planning. Efforts internationally have attempted to define the role of urban planners through licensure acts. The US State of New Jersey and the Canadian province of Nova Scotia license Professional Planners. All Canadian provinces and territories except Newfoundland and Labrador and Quebec restrict the use of the term 'Registered Professional Planner' to licensed urban planners. In Quebec, urban planners must be licensed by the l'Orde des Urbaniste du Quebec.

Urban planners by country

Canada

Urban planners in Canada usually hold bachelor's degrees in planning or a master's degree, typically accredited as an M.Pl. (Master of Planning), MUP (Master of Urban Planning) MCP (Master of City Planning), MSc.Pl. (Master of Science in Planning), M.Pl.(Master of Urban and Regional Planning), MES (Master of Environmental Studies) or simply an MA (Master of Arts).

Professional certification is offered by the Canadian Institute of Planners and its provincial and territorial affiliates. The Institute accredits planning education programs, and sets standards for entry into the profession. Each provincial or territorial body is responsible for licensing and regulating members within its borders. Provincial and territorial affiliates may allow certified members to use the title of Registered Professional Planner (RPP).

Greece

Urban planners in Greece typically graduate from Engineering faculties. Aristotle University of Thessaloniki and University of Thessaly are the two universities that provide undergraduate studies in urban planning in Greece.

India

Though planning is not a recognized profession under Indian law, the profession began in 1941  in Delhi College of Engineering now the Delhi Technological University. It was later integrated with the School of Town and Country Planning which was established in 1955 by the Government of India to provide facilities for rural, urban and regional planning. On integration, the school was renamed as School of Planning and Architecture in 1959. Today, it is one of the premier schools of pursuing planning studies at bachelor, masters and post doctorate levels.

The Institute of Town Planners, India (ITPI), set up on the lines of the Royal Town Planning Institute in London is the body representing planning professionals in India. A small group formed itself into an Indian Board of Town Planners which after three years of continuous work formed the ITPI. The institute, which was established in July 1951, today, has a membership of over 2800, apart from a sizable number of student members, many of whom have qualified Associateship Examination (AITP) conducted by ITPI. As of 2012, the institute has 21 regional chapters across India.
School of Planning and Architecture(SPA),Delhi is one of the premier institute in dissemination knowledge of Architecture and Planning in India. It was established in 1941. In 1979, the Government of India, through the then Ministry of Education and Culture, conferred on the School of Planning and Architecture the status of "Deemed to be a University"(http://spa.ac.in/Home.aspx?ReturnUrl=%2f)
School of Planning and Architecture-Bhopal (M.P.) and School of Planning and Architecture-Vijayawada established in year 2008 by Ministry of Human Resource Development, Government of India.
Centre for Environment Planning and Technology (CEPT) University  in Ahmedabad and Malaviya National Institute of Technology (NIT) Jaipur, Maulana Azad National Institute of Technology (N.I.T) in Bhopal along with NIT Patna and State Universities like IGDTUW, Delhi are one of the pioneering Institutes in India where urban planning is taught. Post-graduation such as Master of engineering, Master of technology are also available in india.

Israel

The Israel Planners Association was founded in 1965. Urban planning is taught by two institutions. the Technion Faculty of Architecture and Urban Planning in Haifa and the Center for Urban and Regional Studies.
The second institution is The Hebrew University of Jerusalem qualifying a Graduate Degree (M.A.) in Geography and Urban and Regional Planning.

Malaysia
In Malaysia, urban planners typically hold a bachelor's degree or master's degree in planning. Several universities in Malaysia, such as Universiti Teknologi Malaysia (UTM), Universiti Malaya (UM), Universiti Teknologi MARA (UiTM), International Islamic University Malaysia (UIAM) and Universiti Sains Malaysia (USM) offer programs in urban and regional planning at both the undergraduate and postgraduate levels. In addition, there are also colleges that offer diploma and certificate courses in urban planning. These educational institutions provide students with the knowledge and skills necessary to pursue careers in the field of urban planning.

Professional certification is available through the Malaysian Institute of Planners (MIP) and its state-level affiliates. The Institute accredits planning education programs and establishes standards for entry into the profession. Each state-level body is responsible for licensing and regulating members within its jurisdiction. State-level affiliates may allow certified members to use the title of Registered Town Planner (RTP).

Mexico

Urban planners in Mexico typically graduate from an Architecture background provided by major universities in the country. Most of such degrees can be awarded at Masters' graduate studies, although there are also bachelor's degrees available.

New Zealand

A planner brings professional expertise and knowledge to the development and implementation of policy in the interests of productive, liveable and sustainable environments. Planners support communities and provide leadership in making informed choices about the consequences of human actions and in bridging the gap between the present and the future. Planners must consider and balance a range of strategic, policy, technical, legal, administrative, community and environmental factors in their contributions to informed decision-making.

Planners are employed in diverse public and private roles. They use their knowledge and experience in various institutional and community settings to provide leadership, undertake research, solve problems, evaluate alternatives and outcomes, manage change, and envision, advise on and enact desirable future directions.

In applying their expertise, planners must be aware of and responsive to cultural, social, economic, environmental, ethical and political values. In New Zealand, these include the bicultural mandate for planning, including the partnership relationships established by the Treaty of Waitangi/te Tiriti o Waitangi, and New Zealand's increasingly multicultural society.

A key attribute of a planner is the ability to work across disciplinary and institutional boundaries and to integrate knowledge from a range of disciplines within the distinctive framework of the discipline of planning.

A professional planner is someone who has gained a professional qualification through tertiary study, continues to learn post qualification, undertakes continuing professional development, is a member or is working towards becoming a member of the New Zealand Planning Institute (NZPI), contributes to the planning profession, and is committed to upholding the principles and ethical practices of the planning profession.

Nigeria

In Nigeria, the Nigerian Institute of Town Planners (NITP) and the Town Planners Registration Council (TOPREC) are the leading bodies tasked with the responsibility of improving the training, education and professional practice of planning in Nigeria.

To be a town planner in Nigeria, first must complete a degree in Urban and regional planning or a relevant discipline and then complete a final year in the form of a masters in Urban and regional planning which must be accredited by the Town Planners Registration Council (TOPREC ), or a four-year degree encapsulating all aspects. they can then become eligible to be a member of the Nigerian Institute of Town Planners (NITP), but must first complete two years work based training, to be a full member, and subsequently register and sit for the TOPREC professional examination, to become a registered town planner.

South Africa

The South African Council for Planners (SACPLAN) is the statutory Council of nominated members appointed in terms of the Planning Profession Act, 2002 (Act 36 of 2002) by the Minister of Rural Development and Land Reform (Department of Rural Development and Land Reform) to regulate the Planning Profession(Planning is both the organizational process of creating and maintaining a plan) in terms of the Act. The Planning Profession Principles applies to all registered planners. The SACPLAN through the Act assures quality in the planning profession through the identification of planning profession work that only registered planners can undertake. The functions of the SACPLAN are contained in Section 7 of the Act. The powers and duties of the SACPLAN are contained in Section 8 of the Act. The Act further prescribes a Professional Code of Conduct for registered planners

United Kingdom

Those wishing to be a town planner, in the United Kingdom, first must complete a degree in a relevant discipline and then complete a final year in the form of a masters in town and country planning which must be accredited by the Royal Town Planning Institute (RTPI), or a four-year degree encapsulating all aspects. They can then become eligible to be a member of the RTPI, but must first complete two years work based training, to be a full, chartered member.

Town planners in the UK are responsible for all aspects of the built environment, wherever you are within the UK a town planner will have at sometime planned the built aspects of the environment. Local planning authorities grant planning permission to individuals, private builders and corporations, and employed officers of these authorities (which usually is a specific council for an area) involved in the decision-making process are referred to as planning officers (though those employed with a specialisation may have a different role title, such as conservation officer or landscape officer).

United States
Planners in the U.S. typically complete an undergraduate or graduate degree from a university offering the program of study.  Professional certification is only offered through the American Institute of Certified Planners (AICP), a branch of the American Planning Association.  To gain AICP certification, a planner must meet specific educational and experience requirements, as well as pass an exam covering the nature and practice of the discipline.  Although AICP certification is not required to be a practicing planner, it does serve as a means in which a planner can verify his or her professional expertise.

Palestine
Planners in Palestine took responsibility after the Palestinian Authority took governance in the West Bank and Gaza- Palestine. Planners have been trained by a Norwegian consultants As Plan Viak at the very beginning as part of the institutional capacity training project funded by the Norwegian Government. Both Birzeit and Alanjah Universities run bachelor's and master's degree in planning and planners could specialize in different fields.

Urban planning in media 
In the Seinfeld episode "The Van Buren Boys," George offers a scholarship to an average student who is initially interested in becoming an architect, but later decides they are more interested in urban planning.

See also 
 List of urban planners
 List of urban theorists
 Municipal engineering
 Urban planning education
 Royal Town Planning Institute

Footnotes

Further reading
Alexander, D. & Calliou, S. (1991). Planner as educator: A vision of a new practitioner. Plan Canada, 31(6), 38–45. Retrieved from VIUSpace

External links 
 International Society of City and Regional Planners
 Singapore Institute of Planners
 New Zealand Planning Institute

Planning